Red Gone Wild: Thee Album is the sixth studio album by rapper Redman. It was released on March 27, 2007 via his own label Gilla House Records in conjunction with Def Jam Recordings.

Background
The album was delayed numerous times by Def Jam and Redman himself, with early promotion dating back to Ghostface Killah's 2004 album, The Pretty Toney Album. Redman stated that he didn't want his album to get under promoted like recent Def Jam albums from Method Man, Ghostface, and The Roots, which explained the long delay for the release of Red Gone Wild. He also stated that he was waiting for the right time to drop it in hip hop's fast changing landscape.

The first single was "Put It Down" (produced by Timbaland) with additional vocals by DJ Kool.

The album leaked onto the Internet on March 22, 2007. Following its release, the album debuted at number 13 on the U.S. Billboard 200, selling about 44,000 copies in its first week.

Music videos
A music video was shot for "Da Countdown (The Saga Continues)", which was going to be the first single back in 2004.

Another music video, for "Fuck da Security/Rush da Security," can be found on the UK release as a bonus track.

Smack DVD shot a music video for "Gillahouse Check."

Official videos were made for "Put It Down" featuring a guest appearance by MTV personality Vincent "Don Vito" Margera, and "Get 'Em" featuring Gilla House artists Saukrates and Icadon.

Videos were produced for "Gimmie One" and "Freestyle Freestyle."

Leftover tracks

In 2002, there was talk of guest appearances by Eminem & 50 Cent, Christina Aguilera, and P. Diddy, with a release date set as early as March 2003, but it is not known if those songs were ever recorded. In that time period, the album had the rumored title Re-Vended. In 2003, Redman told The Source he was going for a different feel then his previous albums with production by Fred Wreck, JellyRoll, and MegaHertz among others. Tracks mentioned were "Car Banga", "Reggie's Got A Gun", and "Blow Your Doors Off".
Even though a lot changed since then, the overall tracks that were supposed to be on the album made it onto the final cut.

Leftover tracks include "I C Dead People" produced by Eminem, and "Future Thugs" produced by Black Key and featuring Ghostface Killah, Ludacris & Icadon. In 2005, Redman played a song titled "Be a Gorilla" which was never released.

In two particular interviews, Redman mentioned he did 10 tracks with Scott Storch and four with Timbaland. It was rumored that Redman recorded as many as 300 studio songs between 2001 and 2007.

Track listing

Samples 
"Gimmie One"

"The Break In" by Marvin Gaye

"Walk in Gutta"

"Heart of Glass" by Blondie
"El Shabazz" by LL Cool J
"Change The Beat" by Beside & Fab 5 Freddy
"Just Rhymin' With Biz" by Big Daddy Kane
"Blow Treez"

"The Sun Is Shining" by Bob Marley

"Merry Jane"

"Mary Jane" by Rick James

"Gilla House Check"

"Snip Snap" by Goblin

"Rite Now"

"Right Now Right Now" by Al Green

"Wutchoogonnado"

"Midnight Groove" by Love Unlimited Orchestra

"Dis Iz Brick City"

"You're the Joy of My Life" by Millie Jackson

"Mr. Ice Cream Man" (skit)"

"The Entertainer" by Scott Joplin

"Soopaman Luva 6 (Part I, Part 2)"

"Give Me Your Love (Love Song)" by Curtis Mayfield

"Hold Dis Blaow!"

"Things Done Changed" by Notorious B.I.G.

References

External links
 Official Red Gone Wild Site

2007 albums
Redman (rapper) albums
Def Jam Recordings albums
Albums produced by Timbaland
Albums produced by Pete Rock
Albums produced by Rockwilder
Albums produced by Scott Storch
Albums produced by Erick Sermon